Tegtmeier klärt auf! is a German television series.

See also
List of German television series

External links
 

German comedy television series
1981 German television series debuts
1983 German television series endings
German-language television shows
ZDF original programming